Rudolf Nelson (4 April 1878 – 5 February 1960) was a German composer of hit songs, film music, operetta and vaudeville, and the founder and director of the Nelson Revue, a significant cabaret troupe on the 1930s Berlin nightlife scene.

Biography
Issued from a poor Prussian Jewish family, and raised in Berlin, Nelson began piano lessons at a very young age.

After secondary school, while simultaneously earning a living as an apprentice and subsequently clerk, he received a scholarship from Heinrich von Herzogenberg to the Stern Conservatory.

Nelson first came into public view during this same period when, in a contest organized by the newspaper Die Woche, he was awarded first prize for the best composition of a walse.

But the real turning point came when Nelson discovered the Überbrettl, Berlin’s first cabaret founded by Ernst von Wolzogen. Inspired by the genre, he began his cabaret career at the Potsdamer Straße cabaret Roland, accompanying his own compositions on the piano.

In 1904, he joined forces with Paul Schneider-Duncker in the famed Chat Noir on Unter den Linden, Berlin’s most fashionable avenue, going on to direct it on his own from 1907 – 1914. It also is here that Nelson composed his most famous hit song Das Ladenmädel, as well as from 1908 onwards wrote his famous operetta works, notably Miss Dudelsack.

In 1910, Nelson gave birth to a son, Herbert. Herbert Nelson would later become one of many collaborative lyricists, a list that included Kurt Tucholsky and Friedrich Hollander.

In 1920, Nelson married singer Käthe Erlholz, and in the same year opened the Nelson-Theater on Kurfürstendamm (associated with the Sans Soucis restaurant). The revues he staged here are legend, presenting numerous top stars of the period, including names such as Josephine Baker, who appeared on 14 January 1926, Weintraubs Syncopators and comic Max Ehrlich. During these years, Nelson also composed revues for Berlin’s famed Metropol-Theater in the Admiralspalast.

Forced by the Nazis in 1933 to flee Germany – after stopping for stage appearances in Vienna and Zurich –  Nelson founded a new theater troupe in Amsterdam, until after the German occupation he was interned in Westerbork concentration camp. Nelson survived the Holocaust, and in 1949 returned to Berlin where he reopened the Nelson-Revue-Gastspiel.

Works

Revues

 Chauffeur ins Metropol!
 Hoheit amüsiert sich
 Wenn die Nacht beginnt
 Karussell
 Seifenblasen
 Was träumt Berlin?
 Die Peruanerin
 Halloh, halloh
 Zwölf Monate
 Total Manoli
 Bitte zahlen!
 Wir stehn verkehrt
 Confetti
 Madame Revue
 Es geht schon besser
 Die Nacht der Nächte
 Du u. ich
 Die Lichter v. Berlin
 Quick
 Der rote Faden
 Glück muß man haben
 Es hat geklingelt
 Etwas für Sie
 Rudolf Nelson erzählt

Operettas
 Miss Dudelsack; libretto by Fritz Grünbaum and 
 Der Damenkrieg
 Incognito
 New York-Berlin
 Die Damen vom Olymp
 Die tanzenden Fräuleins

Awards
1953: received into Ordre national du Mérite
1959: the Paul Lincke-Ring, a bi-annual award for light music composition

References

Sources

 Keller  O., Die Operette. Wien 1926
 Westermeyer K., Die Operette im Wandel der Zeiten. München 1931
 Bernauer R., Das Theater meines Lebens. Berlin 1955
 Schaeffers W., Tingeltangel. Ein Leben für die Kleinkunst. Hamburg 1959
 Jean-Marc Warszawski  http://www.musicologie.org

1878 births
1960 deaths
Musicians from Berlin
19th-century German Jews
German composers
Kabarettists
Westerbork transit camp survivors
Officers Crosses of the Order of Merit of the Federal Republic of Germany